Vilakuranja Manushyan is a 1969 Indian Malayalam film, directed by M. A. Rajendran and produced by P. Ramaswami. The film stars Prem Nazir, Madhu, Sharada and Kaviyoor Ponnamma in the lead roles. The film had musical score by Pukazhenthi.

Cast

Prem Nazir
Madhu
Sharada
Kaviyoor Ponnamma
Adoor Bhasi
Manavalan Joseph
Pappukutty Bhagavathar
K. P. Ummer
Khadeeja
Kottarakkara Sreedharan Nair
Lakshmi
Paravoor Bharathan
K. V. Shanthi
Vijayakala

Soundtrack
The music was composed by Pukazhenthi and the lyrics were written by P. Bhaskaran.

References

External links
 

1969 films
1960s Malayalam-language films
Films scored by Pukazhenthi